Ormond Beatty (August 13, 1815 – June 24, 1890) was an American educator and academic administrator who served as the seventh president of Centre College in Danville, Kentucky. An 1835 graduate of Centre, Beatty became a professor at the school the following year, and taught chemistry, natural philosophy, mathematics, and metaphysics over the course of his 54-year career. He was selected to fill the position of president pro tempore following the resignation of William L. Breckinridge in 1868, and was unanimously elected president by the board of trustees in 1870. He led the school until his resignation in 1888, at which point he taught for two additional years before his death in 1890. Beatty involved himself in religious affairs as well, serving as a ruling elder in the First and Second Presbyterian Churches in Danville, as a commissioner to three Presbyterian Church General Assemblies, and as a trustee of the Danville Theological Seminary.

Early life and education
Beatty was born on August 13, 1815, in Mason County, Kentucky, the fourth of five sons of Adam Beatty and Sarah Green. His father was a circuit court judge and a member of the Kentucky General Assembly for the Whig Party; he additionally stood for election to the House of Representatives, unsuccessfully, in 1838. In his youth, Ormond attended the Franklin Academy, located in Washington, Kentucky. In 1832, Beatty departed home for college. His initial destination was Ohio University, in Athens, Ohio, but changed to Centre College "at the last moment and by the merest chance". He spent only three years at Centre before graduating in 1835, as he had "been advanced" to the sophomore class while still a freshman. Shortly before he graduated, he was offered a teaching position by President John C. Young, a position he accepted but did not begin for another year. In the intervening year, Beatty traveled to pursue further studies at Yale University under chemist Benjamin Silliman. He joined the junior class of Yale College and attended six lectures per week for a total of seven months, all taught by Silliman.

Career

After finishing his studies at Yale, Beatty returned to Centre in 1836. He took the position he had accepted the year prior, and became a professor of chemistry and natural philosophy. After spending nine years in this position, he switched to teaching mathematics in 1847, and earned a Master of Arts degree the same year, but spent only five years in this post before opting to resume teaching his original two subjects in 1852. Beatty would spend another 12 years in these positions; this second stint teaching chemistry and natural philosophy overlapped with the American Civil War, which took place from 1861 to 1865. In addition to teaching, Beatty served as the Smithsonian climate observer for Boyle County and is therefore credited with having recorded the official weather observations for the Battle of Barbourville, in September 1861, and the Battle of Perryville, in October 1862. In 1863, Abraham Lincoln appointed him to be a visitor to the United States Military Academy in West Point, New York. Additionally, in 1866, he was awarded an honorary Legum Doctor degree from Princeton University.

Beatty taught until the resignation of President William L. Breckinridge in 1868. To fill the vacancy, Beatty was appointed president pro tempore. After serving in the interim role for two years, the Board of Trustees unanimously elected him president of the college and professor of metaphysics and political science on September 1, 1870. With this, Beatty became the first Centre president who was not a minister. One of Beatty's early accomplishments as president was the construction of the Old Main Building, which began in 1871 and was completed on June 26, 1872, at a cost of $60,000; Beatty was formally inaugurated on the same day. The building has since been demolished, and was located where Crounse Hall is today on Centre's campus. The largest incident of his presidency took place in March 1873, when the Falls City Tobacco Bank in Louisville was robbed of $300,000; the result was the loss of nearly $100,000 in uninsured bonds belonging to the college, leaving the endowment at only $33,000. A portion of the bonds, worth about $40,000, was recovered relatively quickly, and Beatty led an effort to replace the rest of the stolen money which succeeded in raising over $58,000 from the community, church, and other nearby residents.

The Ormond Beatty Prize was founded by students and alumni in his honor in 1886, the fiftieth anniversary of his first year teaching at Centre; former Congressman John Finis Philips gave the address at the presentation. Beatty attempted on multiple occasions to resign from the presidency, submitting resignations on June 15 and November 30, 1886; the latter was accepted, but did not go into effect until a successor had been secured. This did not happen for some time, but William C. Young, son of former president John C. Young, was elected on June 19, 1888, to fill the role. In all, Beatty served as the college's seventh president for 18 years before leaving the office. In an effort to retain  him as part of the faculty and prevent him from retiring from the college altogether, the trustees elected him to be professor of metaphysics. However, they only required him to lecture for one hour per day in order to keep him for as long as possible. While a member of Centre's faculty, Beatty was elected to membership of Centre's chapter of the Beta Theta Pi fraternity, which had been founded in 1848.

Apart from his duties at Centre, Beatty was involved with the Presbyterian Church. He joined the Danville Presbyterian Church in 1835 and was elected a ruling elder of the church in 1844; he served in this position until the opening of the Second Presbyterian Church in 1852, at which point he took the same position there. Beatty was thrice selected as a commissioner to the Presbyterian Church General Assembly: in 1855, 1866, and 1867. Siding with the Old School in the Old School–New School Controversy, he was appointed to committees in 1866 and 1883 to discuss reunion with the New School Assembly and Southern Presbyterian Church, respectively. Beatty was selected as a delegate to the first and second General Councils of the Presbyterian Alliance, held in Edinburgh in 1877 and in Philadelphia in 1880. He was a director and trustee of the Danville Theological Seminary and taught biblical history and medieval and modern church history there on multiple occasions. He also served on the Board of Trustees of Caldwell College, later the Kentucky College for Women, which was also located in Danville. In 1882, he was elected to be the first president of the College Educational Association of Kentucky.

Personal life and death

Beatty was married three times throughout his life, with each marriage ending due to the death of his wife. His first marriage was to Sallie Lewis Rochester, a relative of Nathaniel Rochester; the couple had one child, Charles, and Sallie died after "a year or two". Beatty's second marriage was to Ann Bell, and his second child, Pattie, was born of this marriage. He was married for a third and final time in 1879, to Elizabeth Boyle, widow of Jeremiah Boyle; they did not have children and Elizabeth died in 1886.

Beatty was a slaveowner, and the 1860 census lists him as having owned one slave.

Beatty died on June 24, 1890, at the age of 74, in the Danville home of his daughter Pattie and her husband, John Quisenberry. He was still a member of the Centre faculty at the time, having taught for two years after his resignation as president until his death. He had been "suffering under an insidious disease" for "three or four years before", though he downplayed the severity and effect of his malady and did not give up teaching at any point. He died in his sleep at 4:10 p.m. on June 24 after suffering severe pain for much of the morning. His funeral was held at Danville's Second Presbyterian Church and was presided over by Rev. C. B. H. Martin, who was the pastor of the church at the time. He was buried in Bellevue Cemetery, in Danville; The Advocate-Messenger later said that the funeral procession to the cemetery was "the largest... that ever went within the portals of the Danville cemetery".

References

Citations

Bibliography

1815 births
1890 deaths
American educators
Centre College faculty
Centre College alumni
People from Mason County, Kentucky
Presidents of Centre College
Burials in Bellevue Cemetery (Danville, Kentucky)